Marcos Vinicius Serrato (born 8 February 1994) is a Brazilian footballer who plays for Daegu FC as a midfielder.

Career statistics

References

External links

1994 births
Living people
Brazilian footballers
Association football midfielders
Campeonato Brasileiro Série A players
Campeonato Brasileiro Série B players
Campeonato Brasileiro Série D players
K League 1 players
Paraná Clube players
Associação Atlética Ponte Preta players
Tupi Football Club players
Vila Nova Futebol Clube players
Ituano FC players
Maringá Futebol Clube players
Clube de Regatas Brasil players
Sport Club do Recife players
Avaí FC players
Criciúma Esporte Clube players
Daegu FC players
Footballers from Curitiba
Brazilian expatriate footballers
Brazilian expatriate sportspeople in South Korea
Expatriate footballers in South Korea